Palazzo Eni (also Palazzo ENI) is an office skyscraper in Rome, Italy. It is 80 meters tall and has 22 floors. At the time of its completion in 1962, it was the tallest building in Rome. As of 2015, it is the third tallest building in the city, after Torre Eurosky and Torre Europarco. It lies within the EUR district of Rome and hosts the headquarters of Eni, an Italian multinational oil and gas company.

See also 

 List of tallest buildings in Rome

References 

Skyscrapers in Rome
Headquarters in Italy
Rome Q. XXXII Europa
Skyscraper office buildings in Italy
Office buildings completed in 1962